Arlanza may refer to:

Arlanza (river), a river in Spain
Arlanza (comarca), an area of Spain
Arlanza (DO), a Spanish wine from the area
San Pedro de Arlanza, a Benedictine monastery
Arlanza, California
,  a British liner in service from 1912 to 1938
, a liner launched in 1960

See also